The 1950 Miami Hurricanes football team represented the University of Miami as an independent during the 1950 college football season. Led by third-year head coach Andy Gustafson, the Hurricanes played their home games at Burdine Stadium in Miami, Florida. The Hurricanes participated in the Orange Bowl, in a post-season matchup against Clemson, where they lost, 15–14.

Schedule

References

Miami
Miami Hurricanes football seasons
Miami Hurricanes football